Miguel Flores-Vianna is an Argentine photographer, best known for architecture and interiors. He has worked for publications including Cabana and Architectural Digest.

Flores-Vianna was born in Argentina, and lives in London.

Publications
Haute Bohemians, Vendome Press, 2017
A Wandering Eye: Travels with My Phone, Vendome Press, 2019

References

Living people
Argentine photographers
Year of birth missing (living people)